Target-type thrust reversal (also called bucket thrust reversal or clamshell thrust reversal) is a deceleration method when an aircraft lands. Like other types of thrust reversals, it temporarily diverts the engine exhaust (thrust) forward to provide deceleration.

Mechanism 

The part that provides reverse thrust for thrust reversal is the deflector doors ("bucket") with aerodynamic contour on both inner and outer surface at the tailpipe of a jet engine. The doors are in a deployed location when thrust reversal takes effect and at stowed location when otherwise. When deployed, the doors block the airflow in the end of the engine. In this case airflow passes through the inner surface and travels frontward to provide force opposite to the heading of the aircraft. When stowed, the doors seamlessly connect to the rest parts of the engine to provide a streamlined outer surface.

A pair of beams are located in the left and right of the engines with a sled in each of them. The two doors are connected to both sleds by two rods each. A hydraulic actuator connected to each sled is placed in each beam. The actuator extends to deploy the thrust reversal and retracts to stow the thrust reversal in a way that the rods push the doors to rotate about a point at the end of the tailpipe. The actuator may be connected hydraulically, mechanically or electrically to the control system of the aircraft.

In operation, thrust reversers on all engines typically work together, although they can be activated separately by pilots or aircraft operators.

History 
Target-type thrust reversal, particularly this design, was invented in 1968. This invention is stated to be an improvement to previous design. As early as 1963, an invention called "two part thrust reversal" appeared with a similar deflector door design. However, in two part thrust reverser, the mechanism for door deployment and location of deflector doors are significantly different from those of target-type thrust reverser. The inventors (one also as inventor of target-type) states that the design can increase the reverse thrust to 50% of the original thrust. In an earlier development in 1954 called "locks for jet thrust reversers", the design for thrust reversal also contain a flap device to help decelerate and the main purpose of the thrust reverser was to block airflow rather than provide reverse thrust. Dated back to 1945, the first invented thrust reversal device intended to "provide a deflecting device", which can be identified as the first concept for target-type thrust reverser.

Performance 
The reverse-thrust ratio (ratio of backward engine thrust to forward reverse thrust) can be as high as 84%. However, this result is obtained with a cowl to attach air flow in a 7° angle and a large enough "target" (deflector door) installed. A reverse-thrust ratio of 55% can be reached on a simple target without the cowl. A width to height ratio of 1.6 can provide the maximum performance for cylindrical deflector doors.

Advantage 
Unlike other types of thrust reversals, especially cascade type thrust reversal, which typically require major redesigns when applied to different models of engines, target-type thrust reversal has a much simpler mechanism and involves lesser installation inside the engine body. Also due to the simple design, the maintenance cost can be much lower than other designs.

In-flight deployment 
In most occasions, thrust reversers are deployed after the aircraft touches down. However, some engines with target-type thrust reversers allow in-flight deployment, which means the thrust reversers being deployed when the aircraft is still in air. A considerable proportion of Russia-made aircraft like the Tupolev Tu-154 and Ilyushin Il-62 have this feature. Their thrust reversers can be deployed when the landing gears are still a few meters from the ground. The Douglas DC-8, on the other hand, is qualified to use thrust reversal anytime in flight for speed adjustment.

Application 
Target-type thrust reversal is commonly applied to low bypass turbofan engines or turbojet engines. In this kind of engine with low bypass ratio, the core part of the engine produces a significantly larger part of the thrust. Therefore, the airflow from the core part must be blocked in order to produce sufficient reverse thrust.

Variations 
There are two major variations for this type of thrust reversal.

Screw jack mechanism 
This design changes the hydraulic actuator to a mechanic actuator, specifically, screw jacks operated by motors. The inventors state that this design can reduce the weight of the engine and the maintenance cost since the system is more simplified.

Pivot fairing thrust reverser 
This design makes modification on the aerodynamic performance when the thrust reverser is at stowed location. It optimizes the shape of outlet nozzle from fishmouth shape to round shape. It also compresses the deployment system to reduce weight and complexity. In particular, this design moves the deflector doors from very end of the engine to a front position where it has no contact with the aerodynamic design of the outlet nozzle.

Accidents 
 October 31, 1996 — TAM Transportes Aéreos Regionais Flight 402, a Fokker 100, crashed seconds after taking off from São Paulo–Congonhas Airport in São Paulo, Brazil. All 89 passengers and six crew members died along with several people on the ground. The investigation showed that the accident was caused by an uncommanded in-flight deployment of the thrust reverser on one engine; a deficient system design that did not take such a situation in to account; and shortcomings in pilot training procedures.

References 

Aircraft controls
Aircraft propulsion components
Jet engine technology